St Thomas More RC College located in Denton, Greater Manchester, England is a comprehensive school previously known as St Thomas More RC High School.St Thomas More has a roll of approximately 780 pupils and 40 teaching staff.

The school was opened in 1964 and gained Specialist College status in Mathematics and Computing in 2004. Following its designation as a high performing specialist college it was awarded a second specialism in Applied Learning in 2008 and awarded Leading Edge status in 2010.

References

Secondary schools in Tameside
Catholic secondary schools in the Diocese of Salford
Voluntary aided schools in England